George Heriot's School Rowing Club (GHSRC) is the rowing club within George Heriot's School, in the city of Edinburgh, Scotland. It competes regularly in Scottish Rowing regattas and Head of the River races. GHSRC also competes in many larger competitions on a national scale including Schools Head of the River and National Schools Regatta.

GHSRC is affiliated to Scottish Rowing. 

The club has produced multiple British champions.

Honours

British champions

See also 
Scottish Rowing
British Rowing

References

External links 
 Scottish Rowing | The National Governing Body for rowing in Scotland
 British Rowing | The National Governing Body for rowing in the United Kingdom
 George Heriot's School

1953 establishments in Scotland
Sports clubs established in 1953
Sports teams in Edinburgh
Rowing clubs in Scotland
Scholastic rowing in the United Kingdom